Palur, in Iran, may refer to:
 Palur, Minab
 Palur, Rudan